The Office of the Special Inspector General for Iraq Reconstruction (SIGIR) (October 2004 - October 2013) was created as the successor to the Coalition Provisional Authority Office of Inspector General (CPA-IG). SIGIR was an independent government agency created by the Congress to provide oversight of the use (or misuse) of the $52 billion U.S. reconstruction program in Iraq. Stuart W. Bowen Jr. was appointed to the position of CPA-IG on January 20, 2004 and served until its closure in October 2013. SIGIR reported directly to Congress, the Secretary of State, and the Secretary of Defense.

SIGIR's mission was to provide independent and objective oversight of U.S.-funded Iraq reconstruction policies, programs, and operations through comprehensive audits, inspections, and investigations. As of July 2009, SIGIR has issued 22 Quarterly Reports to Congress, 303 audits and inspections, 386 recommendations, and four Lessons Learned reports. SIGIR representatives have also testified before Congress on 27 separate occasions. Moreover, SIGIR's investigative and oversight work has resulted in 29 criminal indictments, more than $81 million in U.S. taxpayer funds saved or recovered, and $224 million being put to better use.

In February 2009, SIGIR issued its fourth Lessons Learned report, Hard Lessons: The Iraq Reconstruction Experience. Hard Lessons provides the first comprehensive account of the U.S. reconstruction effort in Iraq, chronicling the myriad challenges that confronted the rebuilding program, and concludes with 13 lessons drawn from the reconstruction experience.

Influence on Law and Policy
SIGIR reports have led to several important changes in U.S. reconstruction policy. These changes to the law and to key agencies’ policies and procedures have increased management efficiencies and influenced the development of more effective approaches to overseas contingency operations.

Some examples of how SIGIR's oversight work has affected U.S. policy include: (1) the reorganization of the Department of State's anticorruption programs in Iraq; (2) the imposition by Congress of stricter limitations on the amount of Commander's Emergency Response Program funds that can be used on any one project; (3) the establishment of improved processes for transferring U.S.-funded assets to the government of Iraq; (4) the issuance by the Office of Management and Budget of updated procurement guidance, including a number of management and operational best practices that should be considered in planning contingency operations and responding to national emergencies; and (5) the establishment by the Congress of two new special inspectors general modeled on SIGIR – SIGAR, to oversee U.S.-funded reconstruction efforts in Afghanistan, and SIGTARP, to oversee the Department of Treasury's $700 billion Troubled Asset Relief Program (TARP). SIGIR has provided resources and expertise to both SIGAR and SIGTARP during their establishment and development.

Recognition
SIGIR's work has been recognized in three awards from the President's Council on Integrity and Efficiency. SIGIR's findings and analyses have also contributed to key policy papers produced by Congressional Committees, think tanks, and policy review bodies, such as the Gansler Commission, the Commission on Wartime Contracting in Iraq and Afghanistan, and the Iraq Study Group.

While an Army War College fellow at The Institute of World Politics, Brigadier General (Army) Brian Mennes criticized UC national security by pointing at the failures of the SIGIR in his paper "Security Reform beyond the Project on National Security Reform."

References

External links
Official websites
U.S. Public Law 108-106, November 6, 2003—legislation that created the position of Coalition Provisional Authority Inspector General
Special Inspector General for Iraq Reconstruction website
Other websites
Audit of Iraq Spending Spurs Criminal Probe, Washington Post, May 5, 2005
So, Mr Bremer, where did all the money go?, The Guardian, July 7, 2005
Millions go missing on Iraqi gravy train, Baltimore Sun, July 30, 2005
The man charged with auditing the Iraq reconstruction finds he's fighting his own kind of war, Esquire, November 30, 2006
Report cites reconstruction progress, but also problems, USA Today, October 30, 2007
In Ramadi, Real Rebuilding, With Fresh Paint, New York Times, November 22, 2008
Iraq Auditor Warns of Waste, Fraud In Afghanistan, Washington Post, February 2, 2009
Over $8B of the Money You Spent Rebuilding Iraq Was Wasted Outright Wired , March 6, 2012
Security Reform beyond the Project on National Security Reform, "The Institute of World Politics", April, 2013

Coalition Provisional Authority
Iraq
Government agencies established in 2004
Independent agencies of the United States government